The push–pull connector is a type of cable interconnect that provides a strong locking mechanism that is only released by squeezing the connector body, thus preventing accidental disconnects. The connector is cylindrical, enabling a wide range of body styles and configurations such as low or high voltage multipin, coaxial, triaxial, fluid and gas.
It was invented by Swiss manufacturer LEMO. Other manufacturing companies include Fischer Connectors and Switchcraft.

Electrical signal connectors
RF connectors
Electrical connectors